Charilaos Florakis (also Harilaos Florakis; ; 20 July 1914 – 22 May 2005) was a leader of the Communist Party of Greece (KKE). He is best known for establishing the dominance of the KKE over other left-wing elements, and for his flexibility and forming alliances with the conservatives.

Early life
Florakis was born on 20 July 1914 in the village of Paliozoglopi, located near Agrafa in the Itamos municipality, in the Karditsa Prefecture, Greece. He joined the Communist Party of Greece in 1941. An EAM-ELAS partisan during the resistance to the Nazi occupation in World War II, Florakis was on the losing side of the Greek Civil War that followed the liberation of the country, and subsequently left the country.

After the Civil War
On his return to Greece in 1954 he was arrested. During his life he spent 18 years in detention or jail - including being put in internal exile by the Greek colonels in the beginning of the 1967-74 military dictatorship.

First elected to parliament in 1974 after the Metapolitefsi, Florakis led KKE as its general secretary from 1972 until 1989, when, though still fit for the job, he announced his decision to step down from the party's top post and proposed Grigoris Farakos as his successor.

The Synaspismos era 
Florakis did not retire from politics, however. In the same year he retired from the leadership of the KKE, he was approved as the president of the newly founded Synaspismos or Coalition of the Left. Synaspismos was an attempt to reconcile Greece's two main communist factions, which arose in 1968 out of the Soviet intervention in Czechoslovakia that crushed the Prague Spring. That show of brute strength led many Greek communists to break with the Moscow-oriented KKE and to join one of the factions that emerged.

Synaspismos was created partly at the instigation of Florakis, and drew members from both the KKE and the KKE-Interior Eurocommunists. It also became an umbrella for other leftist groups and disaffected supporters of the Panhellenic Socialist Movement of Andreas Papandreou, which lost the general election in 1989.

In 1991, as it became increasingly clear that Soviet communism would not last, a rift arose within the KKE between those who supported continuing efforts towards a reconciliation with the Euro-communists through Synaspismos, and orthodox communists who felt that communism was threatened internationally and favoured a return to ideological roots. Florakis sided with the latter and at the 13th KKE conference in early 1991 —even before the fall of Mikhail Gorbachev and the dissolution of the Soviet Union— the party officially withdrew all support from Synaspismos and Florakis was elected honorary president of the KKE.

Death 
Florakis died of heart failure at his home in Athens on 22 May 2005. Florakis' body lay in state at the KKE headquarters in Perissos on May 24–25 where thousands of party members and sympathisers queued to pay their respects. Party leader Aleka Papariga addressed a civil funeral on the evening of May 25 which was attended by the President of Greece Karolos Papoulias, prime minister Costas Karamanlis, parliament speaker Anna Benaki-Psarouda, opposition Pasok party leader George Papandreou, Left Coalition leader Alekos Alavanos, Cypriot communist party AKEL leader and Cyprus parliament speaker Dimitris Christofias, many ministers and MPs and other dignitaries. He was interred  on May 26 at the Agios Ilias cemetery in his native village.

Awards 
Florakis received many awards during his lifetime for his multiple achievements and political activities:
 Order of Friendship of Peoples, from the Supreme Soviet of the Soviet Union
 Order of Karl Marx, from the German Democratic Republic
 Dimitrov Prize, from the People's Republic of Bulgaria
 Order of Lenin, from the Central Committee of the Communist Party of the Soviet Union in 1984

Further reading
 Wilsford, David, ed. Political leaders of contemporary Western Europe: a biographical dictionary (Greenwood, 1995) pp 144-150.

External links
 In memory of Charilaos Florakis
 Culture centre "Charilaos Florakis"

 

 

1914 births
2005 deaths
People from Karditsa (regional unit)
General Secretaries of the Communist Party of Greece
Prisoners sentenced to life imprisonment by Greece
Recipients of the Order of Friendship of Peoples
Recipients of the Order of Lenin
National Liberation Front (Greece) members
Chairpersons of Synaspismos
Lenin Peace Prize recipients
Democratic Army of Greece personnel
Frunze Military Academy alumni